Ellie Laine is a comedian best known for her sexually explicit stand-up comedy and her appearances on panel shows in the 1980s.

In the 1980s, Laine performed sexually explicit stand-up comedy in working men's clubs while wearing suggestive clothing, discussing sex in "graphic and earthy detail".

In popular culture
Laine made one appearance on A Question of Entertainment, two episodes of Celebrity Squares, and three episodes of Blankety Blank.
She also made an appearance in one volume of Penthouse magazine.
One episode of John McCririck's Morning Line involved her divulging to the viewers that the most interesting thing in McCririck's trousers was its label, and her insistence that McCririck prove otherwise.

References

British women comedians
Year of birth missing (living people)
Living people